Agricultural Development Bank Limited (ADBL) is an autonomous organization largely owned by Government of Nepal. The bank has been working as a premier rural credit institution since the last three decades, contributing a more than 67 percent of institutional credit supply in the country. Hence, rural finance is the principal operational area of ADBL. Besides, it has also been executing Small Farmer Development Program (SFDP), the major poverty alleviation program launched in the country. Furthermore, the bank has also been involved in commercial banking operations since 1984.

The enactment of the Bank and Financial Institution Act (BAFIA) in February 2004 abolished all Acts related to financial institutions including the ADBN Act, 1967. In line with the BAFIA, ADBL has been incorporated as a public limited company on July 14, 2005. Thus, ADBL operates as an "A" category financial Institution under the legal framework of BAFIA and the Company Act. The bank has a 51% share of the Government of Nepal and 49% of the general public. Most of its shareholders are customers and employees.

Its headquarter is in Ramshah Path, Kathmandu.

External links
 Official Website

References

ADBL Register in Company Act at 2062/3/31 B.c.

Banks of Nepal
Banks established in 1968
1968 establishments in Nepal
Agricultural finance